Dzerjinscoe (Dzerzhynske, Dzerzhynskoye) is a village in the Dubăsari District of Transnistria, Moldova. It has since 1990 been administered as a part of the breakaway Pridnestrovian Moldavian Republic (PMR). As of 2015, the population of Dzerjinscoe is 3.

References

Villages of Transnistria
Dubăsari District, Transnistria